Asedillo is a 1971 Philippine bio-pic, period and action film written and directed by Celso Ad Castillo starring Fernando Poe Jr. as "The Terror of the Sierra Madre", Teodoro Asedillo. The film, while critically and commercially a success, is infamous for having begun the SOP of informing cinema owners ahead of time if Fernando Poe Jr. will die in his films as a riot ensued following the death of Poe's character in a screening in Zamboanga.

Cast 
Fernando Poe Jr. as Teodoro Asedillo
Paquito Diaz as Vicente
Barbara Perez as Julia
Jose Romulo as Pepe
Carlos Padilla Jr.
Rebecca
Imelda Ilanan
Lito Anzures as Tano
Roberto Talabis as Tonyo
Ruel Vernal as Abel

Awards and nominations

References

External links

Filipino-language films
1971 films
Philippine biographical films
Philippine historical films
Films directed by Celso Ad. Castillo